Johnny Whitney (born June 28, 1981) is a singer, author and multi-instrumentalist from Seattle.

He is probably most well known for his vocals and keyboarding alongside Jordan Blilie in the post-hardcore band, The Blood Brothers. He is also the vocalist of Jaguar Love. Johnny has also provided vocals for The Vogue, Glowbug, Soiled Doves, and Neon Blonde.

Johnny has gone on to remix songs from Jaguar Love, as well as songs by other artists: "Positive Tension" by Bloc Party, Maps by Yeah Yeah Yeahs and a clash of "Heartbeats" by The Knife with The Notorious B.I.G.'s "Juicy", and is featured on Daryl Palumbo's Remix of Cage's song "Shoot Frank". Some of his remixes can be found on his "DJ Johnny Whitney" MySpace page.

In 2010, Johnny provided vocals for Felix Cartal's track "Volcano", featured on the album "Popular Music".

He runs a clothing company called Crystal City Clothing along with his wife Amy Carlsen.

On the 21st July, 2010, Johnny released volume 1 of his acoustic mixtapes through Crystal City clothing:

On October 1, 2010, Johnny released the short story "The Mermaid and the Actor" through www.crystalcityclothing.com

In 2011 and 2014 Whitney collaborated with Belgium electro-pop group Arsenal (band) on their albums Lokemo and Furu. He joined them on several live gigs in Belgium. They headlined the Rock Werchter festival.

As of 2020, Whitney is inactive in music, and now works as a UI Developer at Netflix.

References

External links
 Johnny Whitney on Tumblr
 DJ Johnny Whitney MySpace page
 Johnny Whitney Acoustic Mixtape MySpace page

1981 births
American businesspeople in retailing
American multi-instrumentalists
American rock singers
Living people
Musicians from Kirkland, Washington
Musicians from Seattle
Singers from Washington (state)
The Blood Brothers (band) members
Jaguar Love members
21st-century American singers
21st-century American male singers